Antaeotricha isoporphyra is a moth in the family Depressariidae. It was described by Edward Meyrick in 1932. It is found in Costa Rica.

The wingspan is about 35 mm.

References

Moths described in 1932
isoporphyra
Moths of Central America
Taxa named by Edward Meyrick